Pavel Huťka (born 28 February 1949) is a former professional tennis player from the Czech Republic who competed for Czechoslovakia, and is now a tennis trainer.

Career
Hutka held a match point against Italy's Adriano Panatta in the opening round of the 1976 French Open, but lost 10–12 in the fifth set. The Italian went on to win the tournament.

He made the third round of the 1977 French Open (beating Jan Šimbera and Brian Teacher) and appeared in a further three French Opens, without matching that effort.

Hutka was a doubles finalist at Kitzbuhel in 1979. He and partner Pavel Složil lost the final to Mike Fishbach and Chris Lewis.

On the Grand Prix singles circuit he made three quarter-finals at Munich in 1975, Nice in 1978 Nice and Stuttgart in 1979.

Grand Prix career finals

Doubles: 2 (0–2)

Challenger titles

Doubles: (2)

References

External links
 
 

1949 births
Living people
Czech male tennis players
Czechoslovak male tennis players
People from Šumperk
Sportspeople from the Olomouc Region